Tianjin South railway station is a high-speed railway station in Xiqing District, Tianjin, China. It is served by some trains on the Beijing–Shanghai high-speed railway.

This station is built as an elevated station and is part of the Tianjin Grand Bridge.

Station layout
Platforms 1 and 2 are used for trains headed for the Beijing South railway station; platforms 3 and 4 are used for trains to Jinan, Qingdao and Shanghai Hongqiao. Two tracks in the middle of the station allow for trains running direct services to continue at full speed without stopping. Trains stopping at this station will not stop at the Tianjin West railway station. Departing passengers will use Ticket Check 1 for trains to Beijing, and Ticket Check 2 for trains to Qingdao and Shanghai.

The station is so built that the ticket office, station concourse and shops are located right underneath the elevated platforms. The waiting hall is capable of holding up to 1,000 passengers at any one time. The square in front of the station is to the west of the station building.

See also
Tianjin Metro

References

Railway stations in Tianjin
Railway stations in China opened in 2011